Strain is a surname. Notable people with the surname include:

Christina Strain (born 1981), comic book artist (colorist)
Isaac Strain (1821-1857), American/Canadian explorer
Julie Strain (1962-2021), American actress and model and musician
Michael G. Strain (born 1958), Commissioner of Agriculture & Forestry in the U.S. state of Louisiana
Rob Strain, NASA Goddard Center director
Ted Strain (1917-1999), Former professional basketball player
Dana Plato, (1964–1999), born Dana Michelle Strain, was an American actress best known for her role in the television series, Diff’rent Strokes
John Paul Strain (born 1955), Nashville-born illustrator and artist known for the vivid realism of his paintings of Civil War scenes
Major Malcolm Wheeler-Nicholson (1890–1968), born Malcolm Strain in Greeneville, Tennessee, was a military officer and author of military and western-themed stories and novels, as well as founder of National Allied Publications, which eventually merged to become DC Comics. Actress Dana Wheeler-Nicholson (born 1960) is his granddaughter.